The 2007 Rushmoor Council election took place on 3 May 2007 to elect members of Rushmoor Borough Council in Hampshire, England. One third of the council was up for election and the Conservative Party stayed in overall control of the council.

After the election, the composition of the council was:
Conservative 28
Liberal Democrat 8
Labour 5
Independent 1

Campaign
Before the election the Conservatives held 26 seats, the Liberal Democrats 10, Labour 5 and 1 independent. 14 seats were being contested with candidates from the 3 main parties on the council, as well as 4 from the British National Party, 1 Official Monster Raving Loony Party and 1 independent.

Issues in the election included the recent introduction of alternate weekly collection of rubbish and recycling, town centre redevelopments, council tax and anti-social behaviour. Another issue that arose during the campaign was the responsibility for a new play area in North Town, Aldershot, with different parties claiming the credit.

Rushmoor saw a trial of internet voting with votes able to be cast this way in the week before the election. 6,600 voters had registered to vote online as well as 5,500 who had opted to vote by post. When the online voting opened however there was a problem with the Conservative candidate in Wellington ward being placed against the Labour emblem, but this was spotted and corrected sufficiently quickly that the candidates accepted that the result had not been compromised.

Election result
The results saw the Conservatives keep control of the council with an increased majority after gaining 2 seats from the Liberal Democrats. The Conservatives gained in Cove and Southwood by 226 votes and in West Heath by 144 votes to hold 28 of the 42 seats. The Liberal Democrats defended the other 2 seats they had held, after coming closest to gaining a seat in St Mark's ward where the Conservatives had a majority of 40. Labour held their 2 seats, while an independent who had campaigned against alternate week refuse collection was well beaten in Knellwood by Conservative Roland Dibbs who won 56% of the vote.

The trial of internet voting failed to increase turnout, which dropped to 35.2% from the 36% in the 2006 election. In total 3,827 of the 6,686 people registered to vote online did so, 57.2%, with disagreement over whether the trial was a success.

Following the election the only independent councillor, Peter Sandy, resigned from the council causing a by-election in Heron Wood ward.

Ward results

References

2007
2007 English local elections
2000s in Hampshire